Lyon County is the most northwesterly county of the U.S. state of Iowa. As of the 2020 census, the population was 11,934. The county seat is Rock Rapids.

Lyon County is named in honor of Brigadier General Nathaniel Lyon, who served in the Mexican–American War and the Civil War. He was killed at the Battle of Wilson's Creek, Missouri, on August 10, 1861, after which the county was named for him. The county's name was originally Buncombe County, but was changed by the state legislature on September 11, 1862.

History
The land that makes up Lyon County was ceded to the federal government by the Sioux Native Tribe through a treaty signed on July 23, 1851. The boundaries of the county were set on January 15, 1851, and attached to Woodbury County (then called Wahkaw County) for administration purposes. Lyon County was split from Woodbury County on January 1, 1872.

The first non-indigenous resident to live in Lyon County was Daniel McLaren, known as "Uncle Dan". He lived near the Sioux River for a short time, spending his time hunting and trapping. He moved out of the county early in its settlement to stake a claim further west. The second settler in the area was known as "Old Tom", a hunter and trapper who lived briefly near present-day Rock Rapids. While setting his traps, Old Tom was killed by Sioux tribespeople.

In 1862–1863, a group of men from the east coast spent time in the county on a hunting trip. They were: Roy McGregor, George Clark and Thomas Lockhart. During the winter, Lockhart and McGregor were hunting elk along the Little Rock creek and encountered a group of Sioux tribespeople. Lockhart was killed by an arrow, but McGregor was able to escape and rejoin Clark. The two continued to hunt and trap until March 1863. During a spring flood, Clark was drowned and McGregor decided to move back east.

The first permanent settlement in Lyon County was built by Lewis P. Hyde in July 1866. The county's population reached 100 persons in 1869, entirely through migration and settlement. The first non-indigenous child born in the county was Odena Lee, born on May 28, 1871. The first election in the county was held on October 10, 1871, and recorded 97 votes.

Geography

Lyon County is the location of Gitchie Manitou State Preserve, which contains some of the oldest exposed bedrock in the country.

Lake Pahoja is located in the northwest part of the county. It is a man-made lake with an area of just over 28 ha (70 acres).

Major highways
  U.S. Highway 18
  U.S. Highway 75
  Iowa Highway 9
  Iowa Highway 182

Adjacent counties
 Rock County, Minnesota (north)
 Nobles County, Minnesota (northeast)
 Osceola County (east)
 Sioux County (south)
 Lincoln County, South Dakota (west)
 Minnehaha County, South Dakota (northwest)

Demographics

2020 census
There were 4,817 housing units, of which 4,466 were occupied.

2010 census
There were 4,848 housing units, of which 4,442 were occupied.

2000 census

As of the census of 2000, there were 11,763 people, 4,428 households, and 3,263 families residing in the county. The population density was 20 people per square mile (8/km2). There were 4,758 housing units at an average density of 8 per square mile (3/km2). The racial makeup of the county was 99.13% White, 0.09% Black or African American, 0.14% Native American, 0.15% Asian, 0.01% Pacific Islander, 0.10% from other races, and 0.37% from two or more races. 0.36% of the population were Hispanic or Latino of any race.

There were 4,428 households, out of which 34.80% had children under the age of 18 living with them, 67.10% were married couples living together, 4.40% had a female householder with no husband present, and 26.30% were non-families. 24.30% of all households were made up of individuals, and 13.70% had someone living alone who was 65 years of age or older. The average household size was 2.61 and the average family size was 3.13.

In the county, the population was spread out, with 28.00% under the age of 18, 7.60% from 18 to 24, 24.60% from 25 to 44, 20.90% from 45 to 64, and 18.80% who were 65 years of age or older. The median age was 38 years. For every 100 females there were 98.40 males. For every 100 females age 18 and over, there were 94.60 males.

The median income for a household in the county was $36,878, and the median income for a family was $45,144. Males had a median income of $29,462 versus $19,385 for females. The per capita income for the county was $16,081. About 4.90% of families and 7.00% of the population were below the poverty line, including 7.90% of those under age 18 and 10.30% of those age 65 or over.

Communities

Cities

 Alvord
 Doon
 George
 Inwood
 Larchwood
 Lester
 Little Rock
 Rock Rapids

Unincorporated communities

 Beloit
 Edna
 Granite
 Klondike

Townships

 Allison
 Centennial
 Cleveland
 Dale
 Doon
 Elgin
 Garfield
 Grant
 Larchwood
 Liberal
 Logan
 Lyon
 Midland
 Richland
 Riverside
 Rock
 Sioux
 Wheeler

Population ranking
The population ranking of the following table is based on the 2020 census of Lyon County.

† county seat

Politics
Lyon County is among the most GOP-friendly counties in Iowa. Only two Democrats has ever won the county: Grover Cleveland by a twenty-vote plurality in 1892 and Franklin D. Roosevelt in 1932 and 1936. Though Roosevelt carried the county in both elections by a very comfortable margin, in 1940 the county went back to its solid Republican roots, and since that time only Lyndon B. Johnson in 1964 has won more than 45% of the county's vote, with Michael Dukakis being the last Democrat to reach 30%. The only other times someone besides a Republican won this county were in 1912 when Theodore Roosevelt carried it in the split 1912 election, and Robert M. La Follette in 1924 carried it by about a 2 percentage point plurality; Even so, both of these men belonged to the Republican Party outside of these elections.

See also

 National Register of Historic Places listings in Lyon County, Iowa
 Blood Run Site

References

Further reading

External links

 Collected articles dealing with early Lyon County history
 Iowa State Association of Counties page about Lyon County
 Informational page about Lake Pahoja

 
1851 establishments in Iowa
Populated places established in 1851